Sam Querrey had a tough road for his title defense – having to battle back from being down numerous times during his matches, but eventually, he successfully defended the title after defeating Andy Murray 5–7, 7–6(7–2), 6–3 in the final while saving a match point at 4–5 down (but on Querrey's serve) in the 2nd set. He also saved a match point in his semifinal match also during the 2nd set down at 4–5 on his serve.

Seeds
The top four seeds receive a bye into the second round.

Draw

Finals

Top half

Bottom half

External links
 Main draw
 Qualifying draw

Singles